Eois cymatodes is a moth in the  family Geometridae. It is found on Vanuatu and in Queensland, Australia.

References

Moths described in 1886
Eois
Moths of Oceania